American singer Noah Cyrus has released one studio album, three extended plays, 27 singles, and five promotional singles.

Studio albums

Extended plays

Singles

As lead artist

As featured artist

Promotional singles

Other charted songs

Guest appearances

Notes

References

Discographies of American artists
Pop music discographies